A refinery is a chemical engineering production facility. 

It may also refer to:

 Refinery CMS, a web content management system
 The Refinery, a restaurant in Florida